Anolis ravifaux, the Saona stout anole, is a species of lizard in the family Dactyloidae. The species is endemic to the Dominican Republic and is restricted to the extreme southeastern part of Hispaniola, including Saona Island.

References

Anoles
Lizards of the Caribbean
Reptiles of the Dominican Republic
Endemic fauna of the Dominican Republic
Reptiles described in 1982
Taxa named by Albert Schwartz (zoologist)